The 1999 Women's British Open Squash Championships was held at the Aberdeen Exhibition and Conference Centre in Aberdeen from 6–12 December 1999. The event was won by Leilani Joyce who defeated Cassie Campion (née Jackman) in the final.

Seeds

Draw and results

First round

Second round

Quarter finals

Semi finals

Final

References

Women's British Open Squash Championships
Squash in Scotland
Sports competitions in Aberdeen
Women's British Open Squash Championship
20th century in Aberdeen
Women's British Open Squash Championship
1999 in women's squash